Arjan Mostafa (born 5 May 1994) is an Iraqi forward who currently plays for Iraqi Premier League club Zakho FC. He has Swedish and Iraqi passports. He made his international debut for Iraq in a 31 March 2015 friendly against DR Congo. Player stop to play football for study

See also
 List of Iraq international footballers

References

External links

1994 births
Living people
Iraqi footballers
Association football forwards
Iraq international footballers